Cherry Branch is a stream in Cedar County in the U.S. state of Missouri.

Cherry Branch was named for the cherry timber in the area.

See also
List of rivers of Missouri

References

Rivers of Cedar County, Missouri
Rivers of Missouri